Xiuwen County is a county in central Guizhou province, China. It is under the administration of the prefecture-level city of Guiyang, the provincial capital, and lies to the north of Guiyang's urban area.

Climate

References

County-level divisions of Guizhou